Philippe Joseph Viard (11 October 1809, Lyon, France – 2 June 1872) was a French priest and the first Bishop of the  Catholic diocese of Wellington, New Zealand.

Early life
Born to Claude and Pierrette Charlotte (née Rolland) Viard in Lyon, he attended the parish school of Saint-Nizier and then entered the minor seminary at Argentière about 1827, proceeding to the major seminary of Saint-Irénée at Lyon in 1831. He was ordained priest in St John's Cathedral, Lyon on 20 December 1834 by Archbishop de Pins. He was a curate in the diocese of Lyon until 1839.

Marist
On 1 January 1839 he joined the recently formed Society of Mary. After a short novitiate Viard was professed on 19 May, leaving the following day with a group of Marists for New Zealand. The missionaries sailed from London on the Australasian Packet on 14 June 1839. They arrived in Sydney on 23 October, and sailed for New Zealand on the Martha, arriving on 8 December. In May 1840 Bishop Pompallier sent Viard  to set up a mission station at Tauranga with the help of a Maori catechist, Romano.

Vicar General in Auckland
On 4 June 1841, Pompallier appointed Viard his vicar general and recalled him to Kororareka. Viard accompanied Pompallier on his voyages around New Zealand on the mission schooner Sancta Maria. It was at Akaroa in November that news was received of Fr Peter Chanel's murder on Futuna Island in April.

With Viard, Pompallier set out for Wallis and Futuna islands on his schooner, accompanied by the French corvette L'Allier. Pompallier remained at Wallis while Viard brought Chanel's remains back to the Bay of Islands in February 1842. Viard returned to Wallis in April with provisions and was placed in charge of the Pacific Islands.

Assistant Bishop in Auckland

Viard was summoned back to New Zealand by Pompallier in September 1845 learning by letter that he had been appointed by Rome Bishop  in partibus of Orthosia and coadjutor to Pompallier. Arriving at Sydney en route for the Bay of Islands in October, Viard was consecrated bishop by Archbishop Polding on 4 January 1846. A few months later Pompallier travelled to Rome and Viard was left in charge. On 23 May 1847, Viard ordained Jean-Georges Collomb (SM; born 1816 – died 1848) in Kororoareka on Pentecost Sunday. Collomb was named Vicar Apostolic of the newly created vicariate of Melanesia and Micronesia. Collomb died of fever in 1848 on Rooke Island, Papua New Guinea.

On 15 February 1849, Viard received news from Rome that two dioceses had been created in New Zealand. Pompallier was to retain control of the northern diocese centred on Auckland. Viard was to be Vicar Apostolic of the Southern diocese, headquartered in Wellington, which was apparently Rome's attempt to solve the Pompallier—Marist quarrels, i.e. sending the Marists south of Taupo with Viard as their leader. he set sail from Auckland in April 1850 aboard the Clara and arrived on 2 May 1850.

Bishop of Wellington
Viard purchased land in Thorndon and the Hutt Valley. In Thorndon (now Hill Street) the Marist lay brothers began building a clergy house and a convent for the sisters. A foundation stone was laid for St Mary's Cathedral. Viard had a vast diocese and few clergy but was able to open missions or parishes in the Hutt Valley, Hawke's Bay and Nelson. The Akaroa mission was reopened for a time but troubles with the Canterbury Association caused its priests to leave. In 1852 the Wanganui parish and mission were opened and after that there was virtually no Marist help given to Viard until 1859.

In 1860 Viard was appointed first bishop of Wellington. Practical questions continued to tax him during the next decade. In 1861, noting the diminishing number of sisters in the Wellington convent, he invited Auckland Sisters of Mercy to come to Wellington. He also brought French sisters from the Institute of Our Lady of the Missions to Napier, Christchurch and Nelson. With the arrival of new groups of Marists he was able to establish priests in New Plymouth and Christchurch in 1860, and in Marlborough in 1864. During these years he remained keenly disappointed that he did not have the resources to support adequately the Maori missions. The Taranaki wars also interfered for a time with the expansion of Maori work.

A new phase of activity was precipitated by the gold rushes in Otago and Westland. From 1861 Viard kept a Marist at Dunedin permanently, and during the 1860s was able to send more priests to Invercargill and the Otago diggings. The miners of the Otago and West Coast diggings helped Viard build up his depleted finances. He visited Otago and Canterbury in 1864 and the northern part of the South Island and Westland in 1866.

In Westland, Irish priests followed the thousands of Irish miners and their families to the diggings, and parishes were established at Greymouth, Hokitika, Kumara, Ngahere, Charleston, Ross, Westport and Reefton. Viard was greatly embarrassed when it was revealed that several Irish priests were active Fenian supporters, and he spoke out against their activities in 1868.

Final years and death
Since his appointment as Bishop of Wellington several requests had been made for Viard to visit Rome. On 8 July 1868 he left for Europe. From 1869–70 he attended the First Vatican Council in Rome, presided over by Pope Pius IX. In his absence Dunedin (Otago and Southland) was created a separate diocese under Bishop Patrick Moran. The affection Wellington people had for Viard was evidenced by the crowd which welcomed him back to New Zealand on 19 March 1871. His health had suffered. By 1872 it was evident death was near.

He died on 2 June 1872, aged 62, and was buried in St Mary's Cathedral and his grave is now in Sacred Heart Cathedral. He was succeeded by Francis Redwood SM.

Viard College
Bishop Viard College in Porirua to the north of Wellington is named in memory of Bishop Viard.

References

Sources

 Lillian G. Keys, Philip Viard, Bishop of Wellington, Pegasus Press, Christchurch, 1968.
 Ernest Richard Simmons, Brief history of the Catholic Church in New Zealand, Catholic Publications Centre, Auckland, 1978.
 Michael King, God's farthest outpost: a history of Catholics in New Zealand, Viking, Auckland, 1997.
 Michael O'Meeghan S.M., Steadfast in hope : the story of the Catholic Archdiocese of Wellington 1850–2000, Dunmore Press, Palmerston North, 2003.

External links
 Bishop Philippe-Joseph Viard SM, Catholic Hierarchy website (retrieved 12 February 2011)

1809 births
1872 deaths
19th-century Roman Catholic bishops in New Zealand
Clergy from Lyon
Roman Catholic bishops of Wellington
French Roman Catholic missionaries
French emigrants to New Zealand